Établissements Billard was a French railway rolling stock construction company founded in 1920 and based in Tours. It specialised in light railbuses and metre gauge and narrow gauge rolling stock. The business ceased trading in 1956 and later became Socofer.

Production

Draisines 
 Draisines : These worked on different VFILs, and for the "Big Companies" which became the SNCF.

Locomotives

 T50
 T75D
 T75P
 T75G
These were designed for the French Military Railway. They were used, among other things, to service the Maginot Line.
 SNCF Class Y 7100

Railbuses

Railbuses for numerous French VFIPs (secondary railways)
 Type A 80D,
 Type A 135D,
 Type A 150D,
 Type A 210D,
 Networks of the Compagnie des chemins de fer départementaux, including:
 Corse,
 Vivarais,
 Indre et Loire,
 Seine-et-Marne
 Tramways d'Ille-et-Vilaine Company
 Overseas networks:
 Madagascar
 Réunion
 French West Africa:
 Dakar Niger
 Dahomey
 Ethiopia:
Several European networks

 In Greece
 In Spain
 A Micheline was built in the 1930s for the PO
 Three buses with bogies on a wide chassis worked on the Nord-Est.
 A series of railbuses with two axles were built for the CFD and the SNCF in 1949 and 1950
 A series of FNC  railbuses were deployed by the SNCF

The solidity of the stock, and the simplicity of construction, means that many Billard engines are still working today.

Preserved Billard rolling stock 

Locomotives

type T 50

type T 75, in several variants (with the series prototype, and some military examples) on the Tacot des Lacs, at the Train Touristique de Saint Trojan and later at APPEVA.

type T 100,

Railcars
Meter gauge

type A 150D
 X153, Portes les Valence (bespoke).
type A 150D
 212, Chemins de Fer de Provence
 213, Chemin de fer du Vivarais
 214, Chemin de fer du Vivarais.
type A 80D
 313, Voies Ferrées du Velay
 314, Chemin de fer du Vivarais
 315 Voies Ferrées du Velay
 316 Chemin de fer du Vivarais
 513 Chemins de fer de Corse.
type A 150D2 Articulated
 222 Voies Ferrées du Velay.
Trailer R 210
 3, Chemin de fer du Vivarais
 5, MTVS ex autorail AM 20 des TIV
 7, Voies Ferrées du Velay
 11, Chemin de fer du Vivarais
 22, Chemin de fer du Vivarais
Standard gauge type A 75D
 X901, Tourist railway of La Sarthe, originally Chemin de fer Mamers-Saint Calais
 X903, Trains à vapeur de Touraine with a trailing car

Rebuilt and modernised vehicles

 XR 1331 (Chemins de Fer de Provence), ex RL1, originally CP, rebuilt Garnero
 XRD 1333 (Chemins de Fer de Provence), ex RL3, originally CP, rebuilt original mail van
 XRD 1337 (Chemins de Fer de Provence), ex RL7, originally CFD Vivarais 33, rebuilt Garnero, mail van
 XR 113 (Chemins de fer de Corse) ex autorail A 150 D1, N°113, rebuilt Carde
 XR 104 (Chemins de fer de Corse) ex autorail A 210 D1, N°105, rebuilt Garnero, previously with CP
 XR 105 (Chemins de fer de Corse) ex autorail A 210 D1, N°106, rebuilt Garnero, previously with CP
 XRD 242 (Chemins de fer de Corse) ex autorail A 80 D, N°32, originally CFD Charentes
 XR 526 (Chemins de fer de Corse) ex autorail A 150 D2, N°526, originally Tramways d'Ille-et-Vilaine

Gallery

Notes

Sources

See also 
 Chemin de fer du Vivarais
 Locomotive
 Metre gauge
 Railcar
 Socofer

References

External links 
 Billard railcar A80D N°313 from Dunières-Saint-Agrève
 Double railcar A150D2 N°222 from VFV

Defunct rolling stock manufacturers of France